Dhoom is an Indian Hindi-language action thriller film franchise. The films revolve around ACP Jai Dixit (Abhishek Bachchan), an Assistant Commissioner of Police and his sidekick Ali Akbar Fateh Khan (Uday Chopra), who attempt to capture wanted, professional thieves. It is the third largest Bollywood film franchise in terms of box-office revenue.

The latest installment in the series Dhoom 3 has earned over ₹557 crore worldwide, making it the ninth highest-grossing Hindi film. As of 2022, Dhoom is the sixth highest-grossing film franchise in Indian Cinema.

Overview

Dhoom (2004)

A mysterious gang of bikers are on a robbing spree, where ACP Jai Dixit gets Ali, a mechanic, to assist him in the case. With the clock ticking, it's up to the duo to nab the thieves red-handed.

The film stars Abhishek Bachchan and Uday Chopra as buddy cops Jai Dixit and Ali Khan, while John Abraham plays the antagonist, with Esha Deol and Rimi Sen playing supporting roles.

Dhoom 2 (2006)

Jai and Ali are assigned to trail an international thief codenamed "Mr. A", who steals priceless artifacts and has chosen Mumbai as his next target.

The film introduces Hrithik Roshan and Aishwarya Rai Bachchan as the antagonists, while Abhishek Bachchan and Uday Chopra reprise their roles as Jai Dixit and Ali Khan.

Dhoom 3 (2013)

When Sahir, a circus entertainer trained in magic and acrobatics, turns into a thief to take down a corrupt bank in Chicago that is responsible for his father's death, Jai and Ali are called to catch him.

The film introduces Aamir Khan as the antagonist, while Abhishek Bachchan and Uday Chopra reprise their roles as Jai Dixit and Ali Khan, with Katrina Kaif and Tabrett Bethell play supporting roles.

Films

Dhoom

Dhoom  was the first installment of the series which was released on 27 August 2004, and received positive reviews. Overseas gross of Dhoom stands at US$2 million with its US gross at $330,400.

Dhoom 2

Dhoom 2 was the second installment in this series which was released on 24 November 2006 in India, where it received positive reviews from critics. 

Taran Adarsh of Bollywood Hungama gave 4.5 out of 5 stars, reporting "On the whole, Dhoom 2 is a winner all the way. For Yash Raj, who've not only produced but also distributed the film, Dhoom 2 should emerge as one of the biggest hits of their career." Rachel Saltz of The New York Times reviewed, "The pleasure principle is palpable in the giddy, slick Dhoom 2, a satisfying example of the new, thoroughly modern Bollywood. It grossed US$979,000 in North America in 63 theatres over its three-day opening weekend ($1.3 million over four days), becoming the third largest opening weekend for a Bollywood film in North America. Dhoom 2 is estimated to have grossed US$8,750,000 total in the overseas markets.

Dhoom 3

Dhoom 3 was the final installment of the series, which was released on 20 December 2013 and received positive reviews from critics. 

Taran Adarsh of Bollywood Hungama rated the film 4.5 out of 5 stars and said, "On the whole, DHOOM-3 is one solid entertainer loaded with attitude and star power that will leave fans of the series salivating for more." The film went on to gross  worldwide in just ten days, and becomes the eleventh highest-grossing Indian film of all time.

Recurring cast and characters 
This table lists the main characters who appear in the Dhoom Franchise.
A dark grey cell indicates the character was not in the film.

Additional crew and production details

Release and revenue

Box office performance
The franchise has been notable for its profit, with Dhoom and its follow-up having earned a combined profit of ₹823.7 crore, according to IBtimes.

Influence
The movie had a significant cultural impact among urban Indian youth. It was blamed for an increase in incidents of street racing, bike-borne theft and stunting on public roads. Besides, there was a new impetus to the bike-modifying scene with youth going in for modifications to their bikes ranging from free flow exhaust systems to addition of NOS kits. In Malappuram district of Kerala, four members of a group of criminals had cracked the floor of South Malabar Gramin Bank in the early hours on 30 December 2007 and looted  2.5 million and 80 kilograms of gold, a total worth of Rs. 80 million, considered to be one of the biggest thefts in Kerala's crime records. The Kerala Police have arrested four people in connection with this and the leader admitted that he was inspired by Dhoom. The media in India drew parallels to Dhoom 2.

Graphic novel
A graphic novel named Dhoom: Redux 893, has been published in 2012 by Yomics.

Game
 An android game based on the 2013 film Dhoom 3, titled Dhoom:3 The Game has been released on the same year.
 Another game titled Dhoom:3 Jet Speed released by 99games.

Cancelled projects

Dhoom 4
There have been large number of false rumors spread of an upcoming sequel to Dhoom 3, some rumors stating that Akshay Kumar would be in Dhoom 4.  However Yash Raj Films later clarified that they had never, asked Akshay for a role in the film.  In fact they further even stated that they did not even have a script, plot, or even an idea, at that point.  The response that the production company gave even further clarified that there is currently no actors yet even signed or in consideration for the so-called "Dhoom 4" by the production company.  This was not the first time such a rumor relating to "Dhoom 4" happened, when Shah Rukh Khan was rumored to be in the film, one of the directors at the production company stated a similar statement that there was no story for a "Dhoom 4".  The actor himself even stated that he had not yet been offered to sign up for a "Dhoom 4" film.  This was the same case when other actors were speculated, with the production house stating the same response. In fact in at some time in 2018, a spokes person of the production company stated that there were no current plans for the movie.  However, around the time of the release of Thugs of Hindostan, a film made by the same Director of Dhoom 3, some people from the production house stated the possibility of a release of "Dhoom 4" lies on how successful the movie is.

References

Film franchises introduced in 2004
Action film franchises
Yash Raj Films
Indian film series
Films adapted into comics